Francesco Dominici can refer to 
Francesco Dominici (operatic tenor), 20th century Cuban-Italian tenor
Francesco Dominici (painter), 15th-century Italian painter